New Organon is the tenth studio album by American heavy metal band Slough Feg. It was released under their original name "The Lord Weird Slough Feg" on June 14, 2019, by Cruz del Sur Music, their return to that label after being signed to Metal Blade Records for their previous album Digital Resistance.

Background and themes 
The album title comes from the philosophical work by Francis Bacon, titled Novum Organum (translated to "New organon") However, frontman Mike Scalzi said that the title song is about Aristotle, and it was written before "New Organon" became the album title.

"Headhunter" is an early song for the band, written by Scalzi in 1992. A few other songs in the album were, like the title track, inspired by philosophical works; "Discourse on Equality" is based on Discourse on Inequality, and "Coming of Age in the Milky Way" is based on the book written by Timothy Ferris. Scalzi stated about the latter:

"Uncanny" was sung by the band's bassist Adrian Maestas, one of only a few Slough Feg songs to have someone besides Scalzi contribute vocals.

Reception 
Brave Words & Bloody Knuckles honored New Organon as #10 in the top 30 BravePicks of 2019. Chris Ayers of Exclaim praised the album, explaining that "the San Francisco band formerly known as Slough Feg hadn't used their original title, the Lord Weird Slough Feg, since 2003's Traveller album. But bandleader Mike Scalzi takes back his band's formal title (and dispenses with their folksy metal of yore) on the blazing New Organon, a decisive return to their more metallic, take-no-prisoners songwriting. Not that they had strayed far from the power-metal leanings of previous albums — namely 1999's Twilight of the Idols and 2000's Down Among the Deadmen — but New Organon brings together all their finest musicality into one cohesive and effective statement." Carl Fisher of GBHBL wrote a moderately positive track-by-track review for the album. The Metal Storm review is rather mixed, stating that while the album is enjoyable, "it does feel underdeveloped at times, and if you didn't get that impression from this review, it is probably because the reviewer always has ridiculous expectations from The Lord Weird Slough Feg."

Track listing

Personnel 
Slough Feg
Mike Scalzi – guitars, vocals
Angelo Tringali – guitars
Adrian Maestas – bass, vocals (track 7)
Harry Cantwell – drums

Technical personnel
Phil Manley – recording, mixing
Batuka – recording (tracks 6 & 10), photos
Justin Weis – mastering
Annick Giroux – art

References 

2019 albums
Slough Feg albums